During the 2002–03 English football season, Ipswich Town competed in the First Division, following relegation from the FA Premier League the previous season. Despite being relegated, Ipswich Town had achieved UEFA Cup qualification for the second season running, this time via the UEFA Respect Fair Play ranking.

Season summary
The financial cost of relegation the previous season saw Ipswich enter administration on 10 February. The financial problems had caused the sale of both key players like Marcus Stewart and promising young players like Titus Bramble and Darren Ambrose, leading to poor results on the pitch that left Ipswich struggling near the relegation zone. A 3–0 defeat at fellow strugglers Grimsby Town proved to be the final straw and manager George Burley was sacked in October. First team coach and former Ipswich player Tony Mowbray took charge of the next four games, winning one, before being replaced by Joe Royle - a former player for Town's archrivals Norwich City. Royle turned Town's fortunes around considerably and they finished in 7th place, 4 points off the playoff places.

In the League Cup, Ipswich reached the fourth round before being knocked out by eventual winners Liverpool 5–4 on penalties, after Tommy Miller's strike in the fourteenth minute was cancelled out by El Hadji Diouf's 54th-minute penalty.

First-team squad
Squad at end of season

Left club during season

Reserve squad

Pre-season
Ipswich went on a pre-season tour of Denmark in July as part of the pre-season for the 2002–03 season.

Legend

Competitions

Football League First Division

League table

Legend

Ipswich Town's score comes first

Matches

FA Cup

League Cup

UEFA Cup

Transfers

Loans in

Transfers out

Loans out

Squad statistics
All statistics updated as of end of season

Appearances and goals

|-
! colspan=14 style=background:#dcdcdc; text-align:center| Goalkeepers

|-
! colspan=14 style=background:#dcdcdc; text-align:center| Defenders

|-
! colspan=14 style=background:#dcdcdc; text-align:center| Midfielders

|-
! colspan=14 style=background:#dcdcdc; text-align:center| Forwards

|-
! colspan=14 style=background:#dcdcdc; text-align:center| Players transferred out during the season

Goalscorers

Clean sheets

Disciplinary record

Starting 11
Considering starts in all competitions

Awards

Player awards

References

Ipswich Town F.C. seasons
Ipswich Town